Mariano Abril y Ostalo (May 25, 1861 − December, 5 1935) was a Puerto Rican politician. He served as a member of the Senate of Puerto Rico from 1917 to 1920.

Early years and work

Mariano Abril y Ostalo was born on May 25, 1861 in San Juan, Puerto Rico.

During his youth, he worked as a notary clerk while writing for El Palenque de la Juventud under the pseudonym of "Florete". In 1888, he founded La Linterna, a magazine that was censored by the government. He then worked for El Clamor del País, a San Juan political newspaper. He also collaborated for La Democracia, another newspaper which he ended up directing in 1895.

Exile in Europe
In 1896, after attacking the government in his newspaper, he was convicted to prison by a War Council. However, he fled to France where he stayed for a while. He then moved to Madrid, where he was detained and jailed for several months. After receiving a pardon from the Ministry of Overseas, Don Antonio Cánovas del Castillo, he remained in Madrid for three years collaborating for the newspapers El Globo, Heraldo de Madrid, and El Liberal.

Return to Puerto Rico and political career

Abril y Ostalo then moved to Venezuela and then to United States. When the Spanish–American War ended in 1898, he returned to Puerto Rico and joined Luis Muñoz Rivera in his political fight. He became a member of the Puerto Rico House of Representatives in 1904, and then of the first Senate of Puerto Rico in 1917, representing the District of Guayama. He was again reelected in 1920, this time as a Senator at-large.

Writings and later years

Abril continued to collaborate with newspapers and magazines like Revista de las Antillas, Puerto Rico Ilustrado, and El Mundo, as well as the Cuban publication Las Antillas. He also wrote poems which were compiled in the 1900 book Amorosas. Other of his books were Sensaciones de un cronista (1903) and Un héroe de la independencia de España y América: Antonio Valero de Bernabé (1929).

Abril y Ostalo was the first president of the Puerto Rican Academy of History and since 1931 served as Official Historian of Puerto Rico, until his death on December 5, 1935. He is buried at  Puerto Rico Memorial Cemetery in Carolina, Puerto Rico.

References

External links
Biografía de Mariano Abril y Ostalo

1861 births
1935 deaths
Members of the Senate of Puerto Rico
20th-century Puerto Rican historians
Historians of Puerto Rico